The Fairmont Orchid is a luxury hotel on the Kohala Coast of the island of Hawaii.  It is managed by Fairmont Hotels and Resorts.

History

The history of Keawaiki Bay is preserved in archeological sites, lava formations, and footpaths leading everywhere from burial sites to cave complexes. The first to develop this region was Francis Hyde ʻĪʻī Brown (1892–1976), who is often referred to as the last chief; Brown was a descendant of a member of Kamehameha’s army and a superb statesman and athlete during the 1920s. In 1972 Brown sold the resort to Mauna Lani Resort, owned by Japan's Tokyu Group, and Kalahuipua'a was renamed Mauna Lani, which means “mountains reaching the heavens,” named in reverence to the five volcanic mountains that surround the Kohala region. In 1990 the resort was finished hosting 540 luxury guest rooms, a spa and  pool.  In 2015, the Fairmont Orchid was sold to South Korea-based Mirae Asset, one of Asia’s largest independent financial services firms.

Renovations
In 1996, $13 million was spent on renovations to the hotel. This resulted in the addition of Brown's Beach House and a private outdoor function area. In 2002 the resort became a part of the Fairmont Hotels and Resorts chain alongside destinations as the Fairmont San Francisco and the Fairmont Banff Springs Hotel in Alberta, Canada. By the end of 2006 all guest rooms and public areas were  refurnished.

References

External links
Official site

Hotels in Hawaii
Buildings and structures in Hawaii County, Hawaii
Orchid
Hotels in Hawaii (island)